Mark G. Schoesler (born February 16, 1957) is an American farmer and politician who is a Republican. He is a member of the Washington State Senate.  He has represented District 9 since 2005.

References

1957 births
21st-century American politicians
Living people
Republican Party members of the Washington House of Representatives
Republican Party Washington (state) state senators